Herblingen Castle is a castle in the municipality of Stetten of the Canton of Schaffhausen in Switzerland.  It is a Swiss heritage site of national significance.

See also
 List of castles in Switzerland

References

Cultural property of national significance in the canton of Schaffhausen
Castles in the canton of Schaffhausen